Empetrum nigrum subsp. asiaticum, the Korean crowberry, is a subspecies of the flowering plant species Empetrum nigrum in the heather family, Ericaceae. The plant is called siromi in Korean and gankōran in Japanese.

References

nigrum subsp. asiaticum
Plants described in 1996